Galileo was an American robotic space probe that studied the planet Jupiter and its moons, as well as the asteroids Gaspra and Ida. Named after the Italian astronomer Galileo Galilei, it consisted of an orbiter and an entry probe. Galileo arrived at Jupiter on December 7, 1995, after gravitational assist flybys of Venus and Earth, and became the first spacecraft to orbit an outer planet.

The Jet Propulsion Laboratory built the Galileo spacecraft and managed the Galileo program for NASA. West Germany Messerschmitt-Bölkow-Blohm supplied the propulsion module. NASA's Ames Research Center managed the atmospheric probe, which was built by Hughes Aircraft Company.

Spacecraft are normally stabilized either by spinning around a fixed axis or by maintaining a fixed orientation with reference to the Sun and a star. Galileo did both. One section of the spacecraft rotated at 3 revolutions per minute, keeping Galileo stable and holding six instruments that gathered data from many different directions, including the fields and particles instruments. 

Galileo was intentionally destroyed in Jupiter's atmosphere on September 21, 2003. The next orbiter to be sent to Jupiter was Juno, which arrived on July 5, 2016.

Development

Jupiter is the largest planet in the Solar System, with more than twice the mass of all the other planets combined.  Consideration of sending a probe to Jupiter began as early as 1959. NASA's Scientific Advisory Group (SAG) for Outer Solar System Missions considered the requirements for Jupiter orbiters and atmospheric probes. It noted that the technology to build a heat shield for an atmospheric probe did not yet exist, and facilities to test one under the conditions found on Jupiter would not be available until 1980. NASA management designated the Jet Propulsion Laboratory (JPL) as the lead center for the Jupiter Orbiter Probe (JOP) project. The JOP would be the fifth spacecraft to visit Jupiter, but the first to orbit it, and the probe would be the first to enter its atmosphere.

An important decision made at this time was to use a Mariner program spacecraft like that used for Voyager for the Jupiter orbiter, rather than a Pioneer. Pioneer was stabilized by spinning the spacecraft at 60 rpm, which gave a 360-degree view of the surroundings, and did not require an attitude control system. By contrast, Mariner had an attitude control system with three gyroscopes and two sets of six nitrogen jet thrusters. Attitude was determined with reference to the Sun and Canopus, which were monitored with two primary and four secondary sensors. There was also an inertial reference unit and an accelerometer. This allowed it to take high-resolution images, but the functionality came at a cost of increased weight. A Mariner weighed  compared to just  for a Pioneer.

John R. Casani, who had headed the Mariner and Voyager projects, became the first project manager. He solicited suggestions for a more inspirational name for the project, and the most votes went to "Galileo" after Galileo Galilei, the first person to view Jupiter through a telescope. His 1610 discovery of what is now known as the Galilean moons orbiting Jupiter was important evidence of the Copernican model of the solar system. It was also noted that the name was that of a spacecraft in the Star Trek television show. The new name was adopted in February 1978.

The Jet Propulsion Laboratory built the Galileo spacecraft and managed the Galileo mission for NASA. West Germany Messerschmitt-Bölkow-Blohm supplied the propulsion module. NASA's Ames Research Center managed the atmospheric probe, which was built by Hughes Aircraft Company.
Spacecraft are normally stabilized either by spinning around a fixed axis or by maintaining a fixed orientation with reference the Sun and a star; Galileo did both. One section of the spacecraft rotated at 3 revolutions per minute, keeping Galileo stable and holding six instruments that gathered data from many different directions, including the fields and particles instruments. Back on the ground, the mission operations team used software containing 650,000 lines of code in the orbit sequence design process; 1,615,000 lines in the telemetry interpretation; and 550,000 lines of code in navigation. All of the spacecraft components and spare parts received a minimum of 2,000 hours of testing. The spacecraft was expected to last for at least five years—long enough to reach Jupiter and perform its mission.

On December 19, 1985, it departed the JPL in Pasadena, California, on the first leg of its journey, a road trip to the Kennedy Space Center in Florida. Due to the Space Shuttle Challenger disaster, the May launch date could not be met. The mission was re-scheduled October 12, 1989. As the launch date of Galileo neared, anti-nuclear groups, concerned over what they perceived as an unacceptable risk to the public's safety from the plutonium in the Galileo radioisotope thermoelectric generators (RTGs) and General Purpose Heat Source (GPHS) modules, sought a court injunction prohibiting Galileo launch. RTGs were necessary for deep space probes because they had to fly distances from the Sun that made the use of solar energy impractical.

The launch was delayed twice more: by a faulty main engine controller that forced a postponement to October 17, and then by inclement weather, which necessitated a postponement to the following day, but this was not a concern since the launch window extended until November 21. Atlantis finally lifted off at 16:53:40 UTC on October 18, and went into a  orbit. Galileo was successfully deployed at 00:15 UTC on October 19. Following the IUS burn, the Galileo spacecraft adopted its configuration for solo flight, and separated from the IUS at 01:06:53 UTC on October 19. Atlantis returned to Earth safely on October 23.

Command and Data Handling (CDH)
The CDH subsystem was actively redundant, with two parallel data system buses running at all times. Each data system bus (a.k.a. string) was composed of the same functional elements, consisting of multiplexers (MUX), high-level modules (HLM), low-level modules (LLM), power converters (PC), bulk memory (BUM), data management subsystem bulk memory (DBUM), timing chains (TC), phase locked loops (PLL), Golay coders (GC), hardware command decoders (HCD) and critical controllers (CRC).

The CDH subsystem was responsible for maintaining the following functions:
decoding of uplink commands
execution of commands and sequences
execution of system-level fault-protection responses
collection, processing, and formatting of telemetry data for downlink transmission
movement of data between subsystems via a data system bus.

The spacecraft was controlled by six RCA 1802 COSMAC microprocessor CPUs: four on the spun side and two on the despun side. Each CPU was clocked at about 1.6 MHz, and fabricated on sapphire (silicon on sapphire), which is a radiation-and static-hardened material ideal for spacecraft operation. This microprocessor was the first low-power CMOS processor chip, quite on a par with the 8-bit 6502 that was being built into the Apple II desktop computer at that time.

The Galileo Attitude and Articulation Control System (AACSE) was controlled by two Itek Advanced Technology Airborne Computers (ATAC), built using radiation-hardened 2901s. The AACSE could be reprogrammed in flight by sending the new program through the Command and Data Subsystem.

Galileo attitude control system software was written in the HAL/S programming language,  also used in the Space Shuttle program.
Memory capacity provided by each BUM was 16K of RAM, while the DBUMs each provided 8K of RAM. There were two BUMs and two DBUMs in the CDH subsystem and they all resided on the spun side of the spacecraft. The BUMs and DBUMs provided storage for sequences and contain various buffers for telemetry data and interbus communication.
Every HLM and LLM was built up around a single 1802 microprocessor and 32K of RAM (for HLMs) or 16K of RAM (for LLMs). Two HLMs and two LLMs resided on the spun side while two LLMs were on the despun side. Thus, total memory capacity available to the CDH subsystem was 176K of RAM: 144K allocated to the spun side and 32K to the despun side.

Each HLM was responsible for the following functions:
uplink command processing
maintenance of the spacecraft clock
movement of data over the data system bus
execution of stored sequences (time-event tables)
telemetry control
error recovery including system fault-protection monitoring and response.

Each LLM was responsible for the following functions:
collect and format engineering data from the subsystems
provide the capability to issue coded and discrete commands to spacecraft users
recognize out-of-tolerance conditions on status inputs
perform some system fault-protection functions.

Propulsion

The propulsion subsystem consisted of a  main engine and twelve  thrusters, together with propellant, storage and pressurizing tanks and associated plumbing. The 10 N thrusters were mounted in groups of six on two  booms. Two separate tanks held another  of helium pressurant. The propulsion subsystem was developed and built by Messerschmitt-Bölkow-Blohm and provided by West Germany, the major international partner in Project Galileo.

Electrical power
Chemical batteries would likewise be prohibitively large due to technological limitations. The solution was two radioisotope thermoelectric generators (RTGs) which powered the spacecraft through the radioactive decay of plutonium-238. The heat emitted by this decay was converted into electricity through the solid-state Seebeck effect. This provided a reliable and long-lasting source of electricity unaffected by the cold environment and high-radiation fields in the Jovian system.

Each RTG contained 18 separate heat source modules, and each module encased four pellets of plutonium(IV) oxide, a ceramic material resistant to fracturing. The plutonium was enriched to about 83.5 percent plutonium-238. The modules were designed to survive a range of potential accidents: launch vehicle explosion or fire, re-entry into the atmosphere followed by land or water impact, and post-impact situations. An outer covering of graphite provided protection against the structural, thermal, and eroding environments of a potential re-entry into Earth's atmosphere. Additional graphite components provided impact protection, while iridium cladding of the RTGs provided post-impact containment. The RTGs produced about 570 watts at launch. The power output initially decreased at the rate of 0.6 watts per month and was 493 watts when Galileo arrived at Jupiter.

Telecommunications

The spacecraft had a large high-gain antenna which failed to deploy while in space, so the low-gain antenna was used instead, although at slower data transfer speeds.

Instruments
Scientific instruments to measure fields and particles were mounted on the spinning section of the spacecraft, together with the main antenna, power supply, the propulsion module and most of Galileo computers and control electronics. The sixteen instruments, weighing  altogether, included magnetometer sensors mounted on an  boom to minimize interference from the spacecraft; a plasma instrument for detecting low-energy charged particles and a plasma-wave detector to study waves generated by the particles; a high-energy particle detector; and a detector of cosmic and Jovian dust. It also carried the Heavy Ion Counter, an engineering experiment to assess the potentially hazardous charged particle environments the spacecraft flew through, and an extreme ultraviolet detector associated with the UV spectrometer on the scan platform.

The despun section's instruments included the camera system; the near infrared mapping spectrometer to make multi-spectral images for atmospheric and moon surface chemical analysis; the ultraviolet spectrometer to study gases; and the photopolarimeter-radiometer to measure radiant and reflected energy. The camera system was designed to obtain images of Jupiter's satellites at resolutions 20 to 1,000 times better than Voyager best, because Galileo flew closer to the planet and its inner moons, and because the more modern CCD sensor in Galileo camera was more sensitive and had a broader color detection band than the vidicons of Voyager.

Despun section

Solid-state imager (SSI)

The SSI was an 800-by-800-pixel charge-coupled device (CCD) camera. The optical portion of the camera was a modified flight spare of the Voyager narrow-angle camera; a Cassegrain telescope. An eight-position filter wheel was used to obtain images at specific wavelengths. The images were then combined electronically on Earth to produce color images. The spectral response of the SSI ranged from about 400 to 1100 nm.

Near-infrared mapping spectrometer (NIMS)

The NIMS instrument was sensitive to 0.7-to-5.2-micrometer wavelength infrared light, overlapping the wavelength range of the SSI. NIMS used a  aperture reflecting telescope. The spectrometer used a grating to disperse the light collected by the telescope. The dispersed spectrum of light was focused on detectors of indium, antimonide and silicon.

Ultraviolet spectrometer / extreme ultraviolet spectrometer (UVS/EUV)

The Cassegrain telescope of the UVS had a  aperture. Both the UVS and EUV instruments used a ruled grating to disperse light for spectral analysis. Light then passed through an exit slit into photomultiplier tubes that produced pulses of electrons, which were counted and the results sent to Earth. The UVS was mounted on Galileo scan platform. The EUV was mounted on the spun section. As Galileo rotated, EUV observed a narrow ribbon of space perpendicular to the spin axis.

Photopolarimeter–radiometer (PPR)
The PPR had seven radiometry bands. One of these used no filters and observed all incoming radiation, both solar and thermal. Another band allowed only solar radiation through. The difference between the solar-plus-thermal and the solar-only channels gave the total thermal radiation emitted. The PPR also measured in five broadband channels that spanned the spectral range from 17 to 110 micrometers. The radiometer provided data on the temperatures of Jupiter's atmosphere and satellites. The design of the instrument was based on that of an instrument flown on the Pioneer Venus spacecraft. A  aperture reflecting telescope collected light and directed it to a series of filters, and, from there, measurements were performed by the detectors of the PPR.

Spun section

Dust-detector subsystem (DDS)

The dust-detector subsystem (DDS) was used to measure the mass, electric charge, and velocity of incoming particles. The instrument could measure impact rates from 1 particle per 115 days (10 megaseconds) to 100 particles per second. Such data was used to help determine dust origin and dynamics within the magnetosphere.

Energetic-particles detector (EPD)
The EPD could also measure the direction of travel of such particles and, in the case of ions, could determine their composition (whether the ion is oxygen or sulfur, for example). The EPD used silicon solid-state detectors and a time-of-flight detector system to measure changes in the energetic particle population at Jupiter as a function of position and time. These measurements helped determine how the particles got their energy and how they were transported through Jupiter's magnetosphere.

Heavy-ion counter (HIC)

The HIC was, in effect, a repackaged and updated version of some parts of the flight spare of the Voyager cosmic-ray system. The HIC detected heavy ions using stacks of single crystal silicon wafers. This range included all atomic substances between carbon and nickel. The HIC and the EUV shared a communications link and, therefore, had to share observing time.

Magnetometer (MAG)

The magnetometer (MAG) used two sets of three sensors. The three sensors allowed the three orthogonal components of the magnetic field section to be measured. The boom was used to remove the MAG from the immediate vicinity of Galileo to minimize magnetic effects from the spacecraft. However, not all these effects could be eliminated by distancing the instrument. The rotation of the spacecraft was used to separate natural magnetic fields from engineering-induced fields. Another source of potential error in measurement came from the bending and twisting of the long magnetometer boom. To account for these motions, a calibration coil was mounted rigidly on the spacecraft to generate a reference magnetic field during calibrations. The magnetic field at the surface of the Earth has a strength of about 50,000 nT. At Jupiter, the outboard (11 m) set of sensors could measure magnetic field strengths in the range from ±32 to ±512 nT, while the inboard (6.7 m) set was active in the range from ±512 to ±16,384 nT.

Plasma subsystem (PLS)
The PLS used seven fields of view to collect charged particles for energy and mass analysis. These fields of view covered most angles from 0 to 180 degrees, fanning out from the spin axis. The rotation of the spacecraft carried each field of view through a full circle.

Plasma-wave subsystem (PWS)

An electric dipole antenna was used to study the electric fields of plasmas, while two search coil magnetic antennas studied the magnetic fields. The electric dipole antenna was mounted at the tip of the magnetometer boom. The search coil magnetic antennas were mounted on the high-gain antenna feed. Nearly simultaneous measurements of the electric and magnetic field spectrum allowed electrostatic waves to be distinguished from electromagnetic waves.

Galileo entry probe

The atmospheric probe was built by Hughes Aircraft Company at its El Segundo, California plant. NASA built a special laboratory, the Giant Planet Facility, to simulate the heat load, which was similar to the convective and radiative heating experienced by an ICBM warhead reentering the atmosphere.

Batteries 
The probe's electronics were powered by 13 lithium sulfur dioxide batteries manufactured by Honeywell's Power
Sources Center in Horsham, Pennsylvania. Each cell was the size of a D battery so existing manufacturing tools could be used. They provided a nominal power output of about 7.2-ampere hours capacity at a minimal voltage of 28.05 volts.

Scientific instruments 
The probe included seven instruments for taking data on its plunge into Jupiter:

In addition, the probe's heat shield contained instrumentation to measure ablation during descent.

Scientific Uses 
Data collected by the probe was used by numerous scientists. Adam Showman  applied his model of  giant planets to explain flows around Jupiter’s hotspots.

Termination
Lacking the fuel to escape Jupiter's gravity well, at the end of Galileo life, in September 2003, the probe was deliberately crashed into Jupiter, to prevent forward contamination of possible life of Jupiter's moon Europa.

Names
The Galileo Probe had COSPAR ID 1989-084E while the orbiter had id 1989-084B. Names for the spacecraft include Galileo Probe or Jupiter Entry Probe abbreviated JEP. The related COSPAR IDs of the Galileo mission were:
1989-084A  STS 34
1989-084B  Galileo
1989-084C IUS (Orbus 21)
1989-084D IUS (Orbus 6E)
1989-084E  Galileo Probe

Notes

References

See also
List of spacecraft powered by non-rechargeable batteries

External links

 Galileo mission site by NASA's Solar System Exploration
 Galileo legacy site by NASA's Solar System Exploration
 Galileo Satellite Image Mosaics by Arizona State University
 Galileo image album by Kevin M. Gill
 Early probe results report
 Galileo Probe NASA Space Science Data Coordinated Archive

 spacecraft
Spacecraft launched by the Space Shuttle
Spacecraft launched in 1989
Destroyed space probes
Galileo Galilei
Nuclear-powered robots
Extraterrestrial atmosphere entry
Attached spacecraft